Mark Frith is an English singer-songwriter and multi-instrumentalist, and currently the lead singer of the band The Troubadours.

Music career
Having already written several songs, Frith began trying to put a band together in 2005 in Liverpool, to have these tunes reach the public. He originally began working with a guitarist and, after advertising for a bass guitar player and a drummer, The Troubadours were born later that year.

After a few years of heavy touring, including playing V Festival and the Summer Sonic Festival in Tokyo, as well as providing support for notable artists such as Paul Weller and The Enemy, Frith disbanded the group in late 2009. During the band's time together, they gained a following in both the north of England and Japan ando released their first album in Japan in 2008.

Frith has been praised for his songwriting. In 2008, Weller called him a "classic British songwriter" and the record producer John Leckie declared him "the best songwriter I've worked with in ten years".

In October 2011, the Troubadours announced they would be getting back to together for a sold out gig at the Liverpool Lomax and, in February 2012, they announced they would be back full-time.

References

Year of birth missing (living people)
Living people
English male singer-songwriters